Bruce Wilson may refer to:

Bruce Wilson (journalist) (1941–2006), Australian sports journalist who mainly worked in England
Bruce Wilson (bishop) (1942–2021), Australian Anglican Bishop of Bathurst
Bruce Wilson (soccer) (born 1951), Canadian soccer player and coach